Route 131 is a highway located in Lafayette and Johnson counties in western Missouri. Its northern terminus is at Route 224 in downtown Wellington and its southern terminus is on Route 2 south of Medford.

MoDOT provides a commuter parking lot (gravel) in Odessa near the intersection with I-70.

Major intersections

References 

131
Transportation in Johnson County, Missouri
Transportation in Lafayette County, Missouri